Arrhyton albicollum, the Gibara white-collared racerlet is a species of snake in the family Colubridae. It is found in Cuba.

References 

Arrhyton
Reptiles described in 2021
Reptiles of Cuba
Taxa named by Stephen Blair Hedges